Muscelul Stadium is a multi-use stadium in Câmpulung, Argeș County. It is the home ground of ARO Muscelul Câmpulung. It holds 6,000 people, of which 3,000 are on seats.

References

External links
Stadionul Muscelul at soccerway.com

Football venues in Romania
Buildings and structures in Argeș County
Câmpulung